Edipo Antonio Rodríguez Encarnación (born 27 June 1993), simply known as Edipo, is a Dominican footballer who plays for Spanish club Hospitalet, and the Dominican Republic national team as a right winger. He also holds Spanish citizenship.

Club career
Born in Barahona, Edipo moved to Soria in 1999, aged six, and started playing for lowly CD Calasanz five years later. In March 2008 he went on a trial at Real Valladolid, but nothing came of it.

In the 2009 summer Edipo joined CD Numancia, after a stint at Club Internacional de la Amistad. In 2011, he made his senior debuts, appearing for the former's reserve team in Tercera División.

On 15 February 2015 Edipo played his first match as a professional, coming on as a second half substitute for Mickaël Gaffoor in a 2–1 away win against SD Ponferradina in the Segunda División championship. On 11 July he was loaned to Segunda División B side CD Guadalajara, in a season-long deal.

In May 2016, after being sparingly used by Guadalajara, Edipo joined Club Atlético San Cristóbal in his homeland. He rescinded his link in August, and returned to Spain in October after signing for CD San José in the fourth tier.

On 16 January 2017, Edipo moved to CE L'Hospitalet in the third division.

International career
On 18 August 2014 Edipo was called up to Dominican Republic national team for a friendly against El Salvador. He made his international debut late in the month, starting in a 0–2 loss.

International goals
Scores and results list Dominican Republic's goal tally first.

References

External links

https://www.futboltotalrd.com/player/edipo-rodriguez/

1993 births
Living people
People from Barahona Province
Dominican Republic footballers
Segunda División players
Segunda División B players
Tercera División players
Liga Dominicana de Fútbol players
CD Numancia B players
CD Numancia players
CD Guadalajara (Spain) footballers
CE L'Hospitalet players
Dominican Republic international footballers
Dominican Republic emigrants to Spain
Naturalised citizens of Spain
Spanish footballers
Association football wingers
CA San Cristóbal players